Videira is a city in the state of Santa Catarina in Brazil. The estimated population in 2020 was 53,610 inhabitants.
The city is called "Capital do Vinho" (The Wine Capital) in reference to the production of this alcoholic drink. In the past, Videira was one of the major producers of grapes in Brazil.  Perdigão Agroindustrial S.A., one of the major food industry conglomerates of Brazil, originated in Videira.

Ângelo Ponzoni Airport serves the city.

References

External links
Official Videira website
Videira info on official Santa Catarina website

Municipalities in Santa Catarina (state)